Sauvignon gris is a pink-colored wine grape that is a clonal mutation of Sauvignon blanc. The grape is primarily found in Bordeaux and Chile, where it was imported with Sauvignon blanc and Sauvignon vert cuttings. The grape produces less aromatic  wines and is often used for blending.

References

White wine grape varieties